Emilio Bonifazi (born 18 July 1961) is an Italian politician.

He is a member of the Democratic Party.

Biography
Bonifazi was born in Frasso Sabino, Lazio and started his political career as a municipal councillor in Massa Marittima, Tuscany, in 1985. He served as Mayor of Follonica from 1995 to 2004.

Bonifazi was elected Mayor of Grosseto on 30 May 2006 and re-confirmed for the second term on 29 May 2011.

He served as President of the Province of Grosseto from 2014 to 2016.

Bonifazi ran for Mayor of Scarlino at the 2019 local elections, but was not elected.

See also
2006 Italian local elections
2011 Italian local elections
List of mayors of Grosseto

References

Bibliography

External links
 

1961 births
Living people
Mayors of Grosseto
Presidents of the Province of Grosseto
Christian Democracy (Italy) politicians
Italian People's Party (1994) politicians
Democrats of the Left politicians
Democracy is Freedom – The Daisy politicians
Democratic Party (Italy) politicians